Songs of Innocence and of Experience is an album by folk singer/guitarist Greg Brown, released in 1986. Brown sets the poetry of William Blake (see Songs of Innocence and of Experience) to music.

Reception

Writing for Allmusic, music critic Tim Sheridan called the album "Some of the tunes are outstanding, such as the easy lines of "Lamb," while some poems refuse to adjust to Brown's melodic structures. However, it is an effort to be commended."

Track listing
All song by Greg Brown.
 "Introduction" – 2:40
 "The Lamb" – 2:54
 "Infant Joy" – 2:02
 "The Chimney Sweeper" – 4:54
 "The Echoing Green" – 2:57
 "Night" – 4:06
 "On Another's Sorrow" – 2:15
 "The Tyger" – 3:23
 "The Angel" – 2:13
 "The Garden of Love" –  0:47
 "Infant Sorrow" – 1:33
 "Holy Thursday" – 2:47
 "Ah! Sun-Flower" – 2:27
 "The Little Vagabond" – 2:55
 "A Poison Tree" – 2:30
 "London" – 3:08

Personnel
Greg Brown – vocals, guitar
Michael Doucet – violin
Angus Foster – bass
Peter Ostroushko – mandolin, violin
Dave Moore – harmonica, accordion, pan flute, button accordion, pan pipes

Production
Produced by Greg Brown and Bob Feldman
Engineered and mixed by Scott Rivard

References

Greg Brown (folk musician) albums
1986 albums
Red House Records albums
Musical settings of poems by William Blake